Hira is a small settlement approximately  northeast of Nelson, New Zealand. It sits in the valley of the Wakapuaka River.

Demographics

Nelson Rural had a population of 1,896 at the 2018 New Zealand census, an increase of 192 people (11.3%) since the 2013 census, and an increase of 360 people (23.4%) since the 2006 census. There were 657 households. There were 984 males and 912 females, giving a sex ratio of 1.08 males per female. The median age was 46 years (compared with 37.4 years nationally), with 339 people (17.9%) aged under 15 years, 237 (12.5%) aged 15 to 29, 1,038 (54.7%) aged 30 to 64, and 282 (14.9%) aged 65 or older.

Ethnicities were 93.2% European/Pākehā, 8.7% Māori, 1.6% Pacific peoples, 1.6% Asian, and 2.7% other ethnicities (totals add to more than 100% since people could identify with multiple ethnicities).

The proportion of people born overseas was 26.3%, compared with 27.1% nationally.

Although some people objected to giving their religion, 65.8% had no religion, 22.5% were Christian, 0.8% were Hindu, 0.2% were Muslim, 0.3% were Buddhist and 2.2% had other religions.

Of those at least 15 years old, 450 (28.9%) people had a bachelor or higher degree, and 192 (12.3%) people had no formal qualifications. The median income was $32,900, compared with $31,800 nationally. The employment status of those at least 15 was that 795 (51.1%) people were employed full-time, 324 (20.8%) were part-time, and 36 (2.3%) were unemployed.

Education

Hira School is a co-educational state primary school for Year 1 to 6 students. The school celebrated its 125th anniversary in 1997.

References

Populated places in the Nelson Region